The 2011–12 Melbourne Heart FC season was the club's second since its establishment in 2009. The club participated in the A-League for the second time. The club was originally scheduled to compete in the first ever edition of the Mirabella Cup, along with fellow A-League side and fierce rival Melbourne Victory, but FFA forbade all A-League clubs from competing. The season saw the addition of a youth team to the club, which competed in the 2011–12 A-League National Youth League season.

Season overview
On 7 July 2011, the club announced it would take part in the inaugural Hawaiian Islands Invitational from 23–25 February 2012. The squad is set to be made up of emerging youth players as the tournament overlaps with the 2011–12 A-League season. Taking part in the Invitational will be Japan's Yokohama FC, South Korea's Incheon United FC and reigning MLS Cup winners the Colorado Rapids.

Melbourne Heart, along with major sponsor Westpac will again stage the Westpac Community Football Festival. This will be three, three-day celebrations of football as well as a thank you to all of the club's regional supporters. The three regional centers will be set up in Albury-Wodonga on 4–6 August, in Morwell from 18–20 August and in Shepparton from 25–27 August with a practice match being played at each venue.

Team kit
From 1 April 2011, all A-League clubs were able to negotiate new kit supplier deals as the previous contract with Reebok had elapsed and as such, Melbourne Heart negotiated a one-year deal with ISC.

In conjunction with new apparel partner ISC, the club offered supporters the chance to submit designs for a ‘Third Jersey’. A design created by Red and White Unite co-founder Steven Forbes was judged the winner. The design was manufactured in a limited run of 150 and sold to the public.

Players

Squad

Transfers in

Transfers out

Youth Team

Statistics

Squad statistics
Updated on 2 April 2012
Players in italics left the team during the season.

Disciplinary records

Last updated on 6 April 2012

Goal scorers

Competitions

Pre-season

A-League

League table

Results summary

Results by round

Matches

Finals

National Youth League

League table

Matches

Hawaiian Islands Invitational
The 2012 Hawaiian Islands Invitational took place from 23–25 February 2012 at Aloha Stadium in Honolulu, Hawaii. Taking part in the Invitational were to be Japan's Yokohama FC, South Korea's Incheon United FC and reigning MLS Cup winners the Colorado Rapids. Due to the competitions scheduling, Melbourne Heart were forced to field their youth team, because the competition overlaps with the domestic A-League season.

References

External links
 Official website

2011-12
2011–12 A-League season by team